Big House Blues is a 1947 Flippy short film.

External links
Big House Blues (1947) at IMDB
Big House Blues at the Big Cartoon Database

1947 short films
1947 animated films
Columbia Pictures short films
Columbia Pictures animated short films
1940s American animated films
American animated short films
Screen Gems short films
Films scored by Eddie Kilfeather